The 1989 VFL draft was the fourth annual national draft held by the Victorian Football League (since changed its name to Australian Football League) as the main method for the 14 teams to recruit players for the 1990 season.  It consisted of a trading period, pre-draft selections, the main national draft and the 1990 pre-season draft and a non-compulsory 1990 mid-year draft. The minimum age for most draftees was 16 and clubs other than the West Coast Eagles were only allowed to choose one player each from Western Australia. For the non-Queensland and NSW clubs, players from those states had to be 19 to be selected, by which time the Brisbane Bears or Sydney Swans would have had three chances to recruit them.

Pre-draft picks

Pre-draft trades

1989 national draft

Post-draft picks

1990 preseason draft

1990 mid-season draft

References

AFL Draft
Australian Football League draft